The Electoral division of Cambridge was an electoral division in the Tasmanian Legislative Council of Australia. It existed from 1856 to 1946, when it was merged with parts of Macquarie to form the new seat of Monmouth.

Members

See also
Tasmanian Legislative Council electoral divisions

References
Past election results for Cambridge

Former electoral districts of Tasmania
1946 disestablishments in Australia